33rd U-boat Flotilla ("33. Unterseebootsflottille") was a front-line unit of Nazi Germany's Kriegsmarine during World War II.

The flotilla was founded at Flensburg in September 1944 under the command of Korvettenkapitän Georg Schewe, though Korvkpt. Günter Kuhnke took over the command in October 1944.

The flotilla included U-boats that had been based at the French submarine bases captured by the Allied advance during the Normandy Campaign, as well as U-boats operating in the Indian Ocean (the Monsun Gruppe). The flotilla was disbanded in May 1945 after the German surrender.

Flotilla commanders 
 Korvettenkapitän Georg Schewe (September–October 1944)
 Korvettenkapitän Günter Kuhnke (October 1944–May 1945)

Assigned U-boats
Seventy-six U-boats were assigned to this flotilla during its service.

References 

33
Military units and formations established in 1944
Military units and formations disestablished in 1945